Kelly B. Quinn (born August 20, 1963) is a former American football linebacker who played for the Minnesota Vikings of the National Football League (NFL). He played college football at Michigan State University.

References 

1963 births
Living people
American football linebackers
Michigan State Spartans football players
Minnesota Vikings players